Vazhappilliyil Padmanabhan Nair Sivakumar (1947 – 1993), commonly identified as V. P. Sivakumar, was an Indian writer and translator, known for bringing in a new sensibility in Malayalam literature through his short stories. Besides four short story anthologies, he published a compilation of satirical articles and translated several works of Jorge Luis Borges and Eugène Ionesco into Malayalam.

Biography 
V. P. Sivakumar was born on 15 May 1947 at Mavelikkara, in Alappuzha district of the south Indian state of Kerala to Pozharamath Padmanabhan Nair and Thekke Vazhappilliyil Janaki Amma. After completing his schooling in Pandalam and Mavelikkara, he joined St. Berchmans College to earn a graduate degree from the University of Kerala. Subsequently, he started his career in 1966 by joining the telephones department but his stay there was short as he was terminated from service for participating in a workers' strike. He utilised this opportunity to study further and after securing a master's degree in Malayalam with first rank, he worked as a lecturer in various government colleges in Kerala.

Sivakumar was married to Geetha and the couple had two sons, Kiran Sivakumar and Naveen Sivakumar. He died on 27 July 1993, at the age of 46, succumbing to cancer.

Legacy and honours 
Sivakumar's body of work comprises four short story anthologies, starting with the 1979 publication, Thiruvithamkoor Kathakal, followed by Karayogam Otta and V. P. Sivakumarinte Kathakal. He also published Thalasthanathe Hanuman, a compilation of some of his satirical articles. Borges Kathakal is an anthology of short stories of Jorge Luis Borges, translated into Malayalam by Sivakumar. Three plays of Eugene Ionesco were also translated by him. His writings have been subjected to study by several critics and V. P. Sivakumar, written by D. Pradeep Kumar, is one among them. Smarana (Remembrances), is a festschrift published on him in 2003. A literary award, V. P. Sivakumar Memorial Keli Award, has been instituted in his honour and the recipients of the award include K. R. Meera, Subhash Chandran, S. Hareesh and Ambikasuthan Mangad.

Bibliography

Short story anthologies

Translations

Articles

Books on V. P. Sivakumar

See also 

 List of Malayalam-language authors by category
 List of Malayalam-language authors

Notes

References

External links 
 

1947 births
1993 deaths
Writers from Kerala
20th-century Indian short story writers
People from Alappuzha district
Indian essayists
Indian translators
University of Kerala alumni
Academic staff of the University of Kerala
20th-century translators
Deaths from cancer in India